Mao Airport  is a public use airport located near Mao, Kanem, Chad.

See also
List of airports in Chad

References

External links 
 Airport record for Mao Airport at Landings.com
 

Airports in Chad
Kanem Region